In algorithmic information theory, algorithmic probability, also known as Solomonoff probability, is a mathematical method of assigning a prior probability to a given observation. It was invented by Ray Solomonoff in the 1960s. 
It is used in inductive inference theory and analyses of algorithms. In his  general theory of inductive inference, Solomonoff uses the method together with Bayes' rule to obtain probabilities of prediction for an algorithm's future outputs.

In the mathematical formalism used, the observations have the form of finite binary strings viewed as outputs of Turing machines, and the universal prior is a probability distribution over the set of finite binary strings calculated from a probability distribution over programs (that is, inputs to a universal Turing machine).  The prior is universal in the
Turing-computability sense, i.e. no string has zero probability. It is not computable, but it can be approximated.

Overview

Algorithmic probability is the main ingredient of Solomonoff's theory of inductive inference, the theory of prediction based on observations; it was invented with the goal of using it for machine learning; given a sequence of symbols, which one will come next? Solomonoff's theory provides an answer that is optimal in a certain sense, although it is incomputable. Unlike, for example, Karl Popper's informal inductive inference theory,  Solomonoff's is mathematically rigorous.

Four principal inspirations for Solomonoff's algorithmic probability were: Occam's razor, Epicurus' principle of multiple explanations, modern computing theory (e.g. use of a universal Turing machine) and Bayes’ rule for prediction.

Occam's razor and Epicurus' principle are essentially two different non-mathematical approximations of the universal prior.

 Occam's razor: among the theories that are consistent with the observed phenomena, one should select the simplest theory.

 Epicurus' principle of multiple explanations: if more than one theory is consistent with the observations, keep all such theories.

At the heart of the universal prior is an abstract model of a computer, such as a universal Turing machine.   Any abstract computer will do, as long as it is Turing-complete, i.e. every computable function has at least one program that will compute its application on the abstract computer.

The abstract computer is used to give precise meaning to the phrase "simple explanation".  In the formalism used, explanations, or theories of phenomena, are computer programs that generate observation strings when run on the abstract computer.  Each computer program is assigned a weight corresponding to its length. The universal probability distribution is the probability distribution on all possible output strings with random input, assigning for each finite output prefix q the sum of the probabilities of the programs that compute something starting with q.  Thus, a simple explanation is a short computer program. A complex explanation is a long computer program.  Simple explanations are more likely, so a high-probability observation string is one generated by a short computer program, or perhaps by any of a large number of slightly longer computer programs.  A low-probability observation string is one that can only be generated by a long computer program.

Algorithmic probability is closely related to the concept of Kolmogorov complexity.  Kolmogorov's introduction of complexity was motivated by information theory and problems in randomness, while Solomonoff introduced algorithmic complexity for a different reason: inductive reasoning. A single universal prior probability that can be substituted for each actual prior probability in Bayes’s rule was invented by Solomonoff with Kolmogorov complexity as a side product.  It predicts the most likely continuation of that observation, and provides a measure of how likely this continuation will be.

Solomonoff's enumerable measure is universal in a certain powerful sense, but the computation time can be infinite. One way of dealing with this issue is a variant of Leonid Levin's Search Algorithm, which limits the time spent computing the success of possible programs, with shorter programs given more time. When run for longer and longer periods of time, it will generate a sequence of approximations which converge to the universal probability distribution.  Other methods of dealing with the issue include limiting the search space by including training sequences.

Solomonoff proved this distribution to be machine-invariant within a constant factor (called the invariance theorem).

History 

Solomonoff invented the concept of algorithmic probability with its associated invariance theorem around 1960, publishing a report on it: "A Preliminary Report on a General Theory of Inductive Inference." He clarified these ideas more fully in 1964 with "A Formal Theory of Inductive Inference," Part I and Part II.

Examples 

These ideas can be made specific.

Key people

 Ray Solomonoff
 Andrey Kolmogorov
 Leonid Levin

See also
 Solomonoff's theory of inductive inference
 Algorithmic information theory
 Bayesian inference
 Inductive inference
 Inductive probability
 Kolmogorov complexity
 Universal Turing machine
 Information-based complexity

References

Sources
 Li, M. and Vitanyi, P., An Introduction to Kolmogorov Complexity and Its Applications, 3rd Edition, Springer Science and Business Media, N.Y., 2008

Further reading
 Rathmanner, S and Hutter, M., "A Philosophical Treatise of Universal Induction" in Entropy 2011, 13, 1076-1136: A very clear philosophical and mathematical analysis of Solomonoff's Theory of Inductive Inference

External links
 Algorithmic Probability at Scholarpedia
 Solomonoff's publications

Algorithmic information theory
Probability interpretations
Artificial intelligence